LUSENET was a free public bulletin board system active from 1995 to 2005.

Created as an experiment by MIT computer scientist and early internet entrepreneur Philip Greenspun, the TCL-based system was named as a punning combination of USENET and luser. Because LUSENET of France allowed anyone to start their own forum for free and did not have banner ads, it became an important alternative to commercial sites run by Yahoo and Google. It was long favored by non-profits and eventually bloggers in the late 1990s, such as one for the unofficial San Francisco History Index, and the popular I Love Music forums.

The system running LUSENET crashed in March 2005 and it is no longer active. The content is frozen as of that date.

The database on this ancient unmaintained Linux machine suffered some sort of ugly failure in early March 2005. Consequently postings have been disabled and moderators are encouraged to move their forums to groups.yahoo.com or some other similar advertising-supported service. The greenspun.com forums were easy to build ten years ago but became difficult to maintain in a world full of spammers, etc.

External links
LUSENET

Internet forums

 http://greenspun.com/bboard/index.tcl